Almost Human is an American science fiction/crime drama that aired on Fox. The series was created by J. H. Wyman for Frequency Films, Bad Robot Productions and Warner Bros. Television, with Wyman, Bryan Burk and J. J. Abrams as its executive producers. It stars Karl Urban as a police detective in 2048 who is reluctantly paired with an android partner played by Michael Ealy. The series premiered on November 17, 2013, and aired through March 3, 2014. After a single season, Fox cancelled the series on April 29, 2014.

Premise
In 2048, the uncontrollable evolution of science and technology has caused crime rates to rise an astounding 400%. To combat this, the overwhelmed police force has implemented a new policy: every human police officer is paired with a lifelike combat-model android.

John Kennex (Karl Urban), a troubled detective, has a reason to hate these new robot partners. Almost two years previously, Kennex and his squad were raiding the hideout of a violent gang known as InSyndicate, but ended up being ambushed and outgunned. Kennex tried to save his badly injured partner, but the accompanying logic-based android officer abandoned them both because the wounded man's chances of survival were low and it wouldn't have been "logical" to save him. An explosion then took off Kennex's leg and killed his partner.

After waking up from a 17-month coma, Kennex has to deal with a cybernetic prosthetic leg and huge gaps in his memory, which he tries to recover through visits to a black market memory-recovery doctor called a Recollectionist, in the city slums. Besides trying to remember as much as he can about the raid and The Syndicate, he is also coming to terms with being abandoned by his ex-girlfriend Anna.

Kennex is then recalled to the force by Captain Sandra Maldonado (Lili Taylor), and partnered with a standard-issue MX-43 android, which he soon throws from a moving vehicle, when it threatens to report his unusual behavior. He is assigned a replacement android, an older DRN model originally decommissioned for police work and about to be transferred to the Space Station. Created to be as close to human as possible, the DRN androids have trouble dealing with some of their own emotional responses, which was the reason they were replaced by the logic-based MX units. Kennex's unit, known as Dorian (Michael Ealy), immediately proves himself unique, with a clear dislike of being referred to as a "synthetic", and a dry, friendly, sarcasm-oriented wit. Key to the story arc is the growth and development of Kennex and Dorian's relationship.

Cast and characters
Karl Urban as John Kennex, a detective who lost a leg after a Synthetic left him behind because he and his partner had a low chance of survival. He awakes from a coma 17 months later, to find his leg has been replaced with a synthetic prosthetic and returns to duty.
Michael Ealy as DRN-0167, called "Dorian", a retired DRN model Police Synthetic. Dorian shows himself to be unique and resents the term "Synthetic".
Minka Kelly as Valerie Stahl, another detective serving under Captain Maldonado and the love interest for Kennex. She is a Chrome, a human genetically engineered for beauty, excellence and success. Other Chromes consider her choice of profession to be a waste of potential.
Mackenzie Crook as Rudy Lom, a technician
Michael Irby as Richard Paul, a detective
Lili Taylor as Sandra Maldonado, the police captain

Episodes

Development and production

The series first appeared as part of Fox's development slate in September 2012. In January 2013, Fox green-lit production of a pilot episode. On May 8, 2013, the series was added to the network's 2013–14 schedule. On September 9, 2013, it was announced that executive producer and co-showrunner Naren Shankar, who joined the series after the production of the pilot, would depart the series due to creative differences, while creator J. H. Wyman would continue as sole showrunner.

The series was originally scheduled to premiere on Monday, November 4, 2013. Fox  announced a two-week delay and that the series would instead premiere with a special preview on Sunday, November 17 before moving to its regular time slot starting on Monday, November 18.

The order of the episodes that aired on Fox differs from the production order of the episodes intended by J. H. Wyman, the series' showrunner. However, due to the (largely) self-contained nature of these episodes, this does not create significant discontinuity in the events of the series, though the increased closeness and trust between Detective Kennex and Dorian over the arc of the course of the series is uneven in the televised sequence of episodes.

On April 29, 2014, Fox cancelled the series after a single season, reportedly due to low ratings, high production costs and FOX's already full scheduling for fall. Ealy acknowledged that the show required "CSI numbers" in order to continue.

Broadcast
The series was shown in the United Kingdom on Watch on May 6, 2014.

The series premiered in Australia on the Nine Network on April 12, 2015.

In Thailand aired on PPTV from May 16, 2015, to August 15, 2015.

Reception

Critical response and nominations
Metacritic gave the pilot episode a weighted average rating of 61% based on reviews from 29 critics. Kevin McFarland reviewing for The A.V. Club gave the pilot episode a C+ grade, criticizing the information-heavy introduction and title card, but noting "flashes of excitement" and expressing interest in how the plot gets teased out and how the detective partnership develops.
 The grades do improve, garnering a B− for episodes two, three, and four, a B for episode five, and an A− for episode six.

The series received an Emmy Award nomination for Outstanding Special and Visual Effects.

U.S. ratings

See also
 Future Cop, a science fiction crime drama that starred Ernest Borgnine as a seasoned veteran of the 1970s LAPD and Michael J. Shannon as his android partner. 
 Holmes & Yoyo, a short lived series with a similar premise and contemporaneous with the above series.  
 Mann & Machine, a 1990s series with a similar premise.
 Real Humans (Swedish series)
 Humans  (British-American adaptation of Real Humans) 
 Better than Us, a 2018 Russian series with a similar premise. 
 Total Recall 2070, a 1999 series with a similar premise.
 Star Cops, a 1987 UK series with a similar premise.

References

External links 

 
 

2010s American science fiction television series
2010s American crime drama television series
2010s American police procedural television series
2013 American television series debuts
2014 American television series endings
American action television series
English-language television shows
Fictional portrayals of the Los Angeles Police Department
Fox Broadcasting Company original programming
Androids in television
Television series by Bad Robot Productions
Television series by Warner Bros. Television Studios
Television shows set in Los Angeles
Television series set in the 2040s
Television shows filmed in Vancouver
Sex robots